Sebastiano Gentili (1597 – 3 August 1667) was a Roman Catholic prelate who served as Bishop of Terni (1656–1667) and Bishop of Anagni (1642–1646).

He was born in Foligno, Italy in 1597.
On 24 March 1642, he was appointed during the papacy of Pope Urban VIII as Bishop of Anagni.
On 30 March 1642, he was consecrated bishop by Alessandro Cesarini (iuniore), Cardinal-Deacon of Sant'Eustachio, with Giovanni Battista Altieri, Bishop Emeritus of Camerino, and Deodato Scaglia, Bishop of Melfi e Rapolla, serving as co-consecrators. 
On 3 December 1646, he resigned as Bishop of Anagni.<
On 29 May 1656, he was appointed during the papacy of Pope Alexander VII as Bishop of Terni.
He served as Bishop of Terni until his death on 3 August 1667.

References

External links and additional sources
  (for Chronology of Bishops) 
  (for Chronology of Bishops)
  (for Chronology of Bishops) 
  (for Chronology of Bishops)

17th-century Italian Roman Catholic bishops
Bishops appointed by Pope Urban VIII
Bishops appointed by Pope Alexander VII
1597 births
1667 deaths